Dommasandra  is a village in the southern state of Karnataka, India.dommasandra is bangalore urban region and belongs to anekal taluk  It is located in the Anekal taluk of Bangalore Urban district in Karnataka.

Demographics
As of 2015 India census, Dommasandra had a population of 10000 with 5000 males and 5000 females.
It has a very famous village fair that is conducted in the month of March every year. Its been celebrated for more than 100 years. 
Every Monday a market is set up, so every farmer can come and sell his harvested crops in the market. People from the surroundings come to buy those fresh vegetables and fruits. 
There are many International schools like, Oakridge International, Inventure Academy, Greenwood High, TISB and CBSE Schools Smrti Academy, Saandeepani Academy are present within the vicinity. Preschools like EURO Kids, Podar Jumbo Kids, Little Elly are also available for the Parents and Children in this location.
This place has a KMF milk dairy, almost all the temples. this viilage have many industries like Tarun textiles , Pavan silks and sarees , Varalakshmi textiles, Manuela baigh weavers etc.

References

External links
 https://web.archive.org/web/20071116153217/http://bangaloreurban.nic.in/

Villages in Bangalore Urban district